Kovalska or Kovalska Industrial-Construction Group is a Ukrainian developer and manufacturer of building materials. 
The company is part of the Svitlana Kovalska Plant of Reinforced Concrete Structures Joint Stock Company, and at that time the Plant of Reinforced Concrete Products № 3 was founded in 1956.

History 

The group's enterprises operate in Kyiv, Zhytomyr, Lviv, Kherson and Chernihiv Oblasts of Ukraine.

The total number of employees is over 4600 people.

The group dates back to 1956, from the date of the founding of the State Plant of Reinforced Concrete Products № 3 in Kyiv, which in 1993 passed the stage of privatization and was renamed into JSC "Kovalska Reinforced Concrete Plant".  The company, and later the entire industrial and construction group, was named after Svitlana Kovalska (1938-1993), a scientist who worked at the company for many years and managed it from 1982 to 1993.

Kovalska Industrial-Construction Group products are represented by a number of brands, including "Concrete by Kovalska", pavement tiles "Avenue" and construction mixtures "Siltek".

In 2000, the process of strengthening the raw material base began — the company included LLC "Omelyanivskyi Quarry".

Since 2002, the development direction is represented in the group. Since then, Kovalska has completed 26 housing projects.

In 2002, Kovalska began building housing in Kyiv. The first projects are residential buildings on Bazhan Avenue.

The next step to ensure autonomy and a full cycle of construction works was the accession in 2004 of the largest metropolitan transport company — LLC "Avtobudkomplex-K". Kovalska Logistics was founded on the basis of the motor transport enterprise. In the same year, LLC "Kovalska-Zhytloservis" was established to provide maintenance for the facilities built by Kovalska Industrial-Construction Group.

In 2006, LLC "Kovalska-Project" own project organization was established.

In 2008, Kovalska expanded its line of construction materials production and launched the production of dry construction mixtures under the "Siltek" brand at PJSC "Terminal-M".

In 2013, PJSC "Darnytskyi Plant of Reinforced Concrete Structures" joined the group.

In 2019, the group continued its active regional development and acquired an asset in the Kherson region — "Aerated concrete Kakhovka". Subsequently, the group invested in a production complex in the Lviv region — LLC "Rozvadiv Budmaterialy".

In 2020, Kovalska restarted the development direction, strengthened the team and increased the portfolio of projects, as well as entered the office real estate market, becoming an investor in five new UNIT.City campuses, and she began construction of the Nuvo business park in downtown Kyiv.

Kovalska Industrial-Construction Group is an active member of a number of leading business associations. In particular, it is a member of the Confederation of Builders of Ukraine, the European Business Association, the All-Ukrainian Union of Building Materials Manufacturers, etc. In 2021, the General Director of the group Sergii Pylypenko was appointed Deputy Chairman of the Board of Directors of the Confederation of Builders of Ukraine, and also headed the Committee on Construction Products of KBU.

Structure

Extraction of raw materials 

Kovalska Industrial-Construction Group has two granite quarries in the Zhytomyr Oblast — LLC "Omelyanivskyi Quarry" (operator of the Berezivskyi granite deposit) and PJSC "Transnational Corporation Granit" (operator of the Korosten-Severyanskyi granite deposit). The assets are merged into the "Granite by Kovalska" division.

The total area of deposits is 90,000,000 m² of rock mass. The enterprises produce granite rubble, screenings and small aggregates. The production capacity of the quarries is 2.8–3 million tons of granite products per year.

In 2020, the group acquired the production complex of LLC "Rozvadiv Budmaterialy" with an area of 140 hectares in the village of Rozvadiv, Lviv Oblast. It consists of sand and limestone quarries.

The planned production volumes are up to 700,000 m³/year of sand and 200 m³/year of limestone. At the Kovalska enterprise in the village of Rozvadiv, Lviv Oblast there are sand sifting lines, a line for crushing and sorting related rocks and a limestone processing line.

Production of building materials 

Kovalska Industrial-Construction Group is a leader in the production of concrete and reinforced concrete products in the Ukrainian market.

Concrete 
The annual capacity of production of ready-mixed concrete and mortars by Kovalska is 4,000,000 m³ per year. "Concrete by Kovalska" is made on concrete mixing units (BZU), 33 BZU on the basis of 8 enterprises. 

At all enterprises of group the unique system of automation of production process is introduced, the modernized equipment and own raw material base is used.

Reinforced concrete and structural 

Kovalska Industrial-Construction Group manufactures serial and prefabricated reinforced concrete structures of individual production for the construction of frame-type structures. Production capacity of serial reinforced concrete is 269,000 m³ of products per year. It is manufactured in 16 shops and landfills on the basis of 6 plants.

In particular, Kovalska manufactures a wide range of floor slabs by extrusion on the technological line of formless molding of the company Nordimpianti System S.r.l. (Italy). Production capacity of prefabricated reinforced concrete structures of individual production - 43,800 m³ of products per year.  Products are manufactured in 4 shops.

Kovalska enterprises:

JSC "Kovalska Reinforced Concrete Plant";
LLC "Concrete Complex";
LLC "Avtobudkomplex-K";
PJSC "Darnytskyi Plant of Reinforced Concrete Structures";
PJSC "ZBV-1";
JSC "Building Industry" (Chernihiv).

Paving slabs and design elements 

Pavement slabs and landscaping elements by Kovalska have been manufactured under the AVENUE brand since 1999.

Production capacity is 164,250 m³ per year. Products are manufactured at the plant of LLC "Concrete Complex" on German equipment Hess. 

Kovalska annually improves the recipes of materials in its own Innovation and Technology Center and certifies products in accordance with DSTU.

Dry construction mixes 

Dry construction mixtures and paints under the Siltek brand are one of the areas of work of the Kovalska Industrial-Construction Group.

Three production lines of the plant provide a capacity of 150,000 tons of dry and 10,000 tons of paints and plasters per year. In the Ukrainian market, the company is represented by a wide range of dry construction mixtures, paints, decorative plasters and primers - a total of more than 100 types of goods.

The production line with an automated control system is installed, which guarantees accurate dosing of components and subsequent thorough mixing. The company has its own accredited laboratory equipped with modern testing equipment.

Currently, in the village Rozvadiv, Lviv region, is also building a plant for the production of dry construction mixtures of the Siltek brand. After the launch of the enterprise, its production capacity will be 150,000 tons of mixtures per year.

Aerated concrete 

Since 2019, Kovalska Industrial-Construction Group has included LLC "Energy Product", which produces aerated concrete blocks for autoclave hardening under the "Kakhovka Aerated Concrete" trademark.

LLC "Energy Product" is one of the largest porous concrete enterprises in Ukraine in the Southern region. The plant's production capacity is over 500,000 m³ of aerated concrete per year.

This is a modern fully automated production, covering an area of over 30,000 m² and equipped with high-tech Durox equipment from Aircrete Europe. Kakhovka Aerated Concrete has a high holding capacity due to the minimum specific weight and low thermal conductivity.

Currently, in the village Rozvadiv, Lviv Oblast, is also building a plant for the production of aerated concrete.  The complex will cover an area of 15 hectares.  After the implementation of the first stage, the planned capacity of the enterprise will exceed 500 thousand m3 of products per year.  Upon completion of the second - production will double and reach 1 million m3 per year.  According to preliminary estimates, the investment will reach €45 million.

Logistics 

Kovalska Logistics is based on the basis of the motor transport enterprise "Avtobudkomplex-K". Kovalska Logistics fleet includes more than 200 units of special equipment: concrete mixers, dump trucks, beam trucks, excavators, truck cranes, panel trucks and other vehicles. The company's assets include railway transport, in particular, five locomotives and 480 cars.

Construction of residential real estate 

Kovalska Industrial-Construction Group is building residential real estate in Kyiv.

In 2021, Kovalska entered the top ten most reliable developers in Ukraine according to Dengi.ua. In the same year, the DOCK32 project by Kovalska topped the list of the most investment-attractive new buildings in the Mind ranking.

Since the development of the residential segment, Kovalska has built more than 769,000 m² of housing in 26 projects.

Operating organization 

In 2004, Kovalska Industrial-Construction Group founded the operating organization LLC "Kovalska-Zhytloservis", which takes care of buildings and provides after-sales service. "Kovalska-Zhytloservis" performs a set of works that ensures the functioning of the engineering infrastructure of various facilities - residential buildings and adjacent plots, office centers, parking lots, etc.

Construction of office real estate 

In 2020, the group entered the office real estate market as a professional player. In the fall of 2020, Kovalska Industrial-Construction Group and the holding company UFuture announced cooperation and began construction of new business campuses on the territory of UNIT.City.

Kovalska's team undertook the construction of five business campuses with a total area of 70,000 m². Investments in the development of the innovation park by the Kovalska industrial and construction group exceed $70 million.

For the development of campuses B06 and B04, which were included in the first phase of construction, Kovalska hired the European architectural firm APA Wojciechowski. The facilities are planned to be Leed Silver certified, which means that they will consume 25% less energy and water during operation. The whole cycle of works - from design to operation — is accompanied by BIM-coordination.

In the winter of 2020, Kovalska Industrial-Construction Group announced the construction of the first business park in the center of Kyiv — Nuvo Business Park.

Nuvo Business Park is a complex of seven technological buildings, which will include class A office centers, apartments and a complex of trade and service services.

The total commercial area of the business park exceeds 88,000 m².  The expected cost of the project is over $90 million.

The project is implemented together with the development company KDD Ukraine.  The expected implementation period of the entire project is five years.

Development of design solutions 

Since 2006, "Kovalska-Project" division has been developing design solutions in the construction industry. The company designs industrial, logistics, trade and entertainment and other types of buildings erected using reinforced concrete elements of prefabricated frame structures. The company also provides engineering support and technical supervision of construction, modernization of the group's enterprises, introduction of new technologies and design of production lines.

Management 
Kovalska Industrial-Construction Group is a family company. The founder, main shareholder and president of the group is Oleksandr Pylypenko.

Sergii Pylypenko is the general director and one of the co-owners. Mykola Subotenko and Volodymyr Surup are also co-founders and shareholders.

Financial statements 

According to the financial statements of Kovalska Industrial-Construction Group, in 2019 the group's revenue amounted to UAH 5.4 billion. The companies transferred UAH 378 million to the budgets of all levels. UAH 146 million in taxes and fees were paid from employees' salaries.

In 2019, Kovalska invested UAH 853 million in its own development.

Research activities 

In addition to production facilities, the group has a Kovalska Innovation and Technology Center, which develops and improves concrete formulations, studies the properties of building materials, as well as fully tests the raw materials and products of Kovalska Industrial-Construction Group.

In 2018, Kovalska Industrial-Construction Group joined the environmental protection project after the consequences of the Chornobyl Exclusion Zone. Especially for the construction of a spent nuclear fuel storage facility, the "Kovalska Innovation and Technology Center" has developed a unique concrete that has the property of not hardening for 5 hours.

In 2020–2021, Kovalska joined the modernization project of the Vernadsky Research Base in Antarctica. Specialists of the "Kovalska Innovation and Technology Center" have developed a special concrete recipe for foundation works.

References

External links 
 

Construction and civil engineering companies of Ukraine
Holding companies of Ukraine
Ukrainian brands
Construction and civil engineering companies  established in 1956